The 2014 United States Senate election in New Mexico was held on November 4, 2014 to elect a member of the United States Senate. Incumbent Democratic Senator Tom Udall won reelection to a second term.

Democratic primary

Candidates

Declared 
 Tom Udall, incumbent U.S. Senator

Results

Republican primary

Candidates

Declared 
 David Clements, assistant district attorney and former Chairman of the Doña Ana County Republican Party
 Allen Weh, businessman, former Chairman of the New Mexico Republican Party and candidate for Governor of New Mexico in 2010

Declined 
 Robert Aragon, former State Representative (running for State Auditor)
 Jon Barela, Secretary of the New Mexico Economic Development Department and nominee for New Mexico's 1st congressional district in 2010
 Richard J. Berry, Mayor of Albuquerque
 Gary Johnson, former Governor of New Mexico and Libertarian Party nominee for President of the United States in 2012
 John Sanchez, Lieutenant Governor of New Mexico (running for re-election)
 Heather Wilson, former U.S. Representative, nominee for the U.S. Senate in 2012 and candidate for the U.S. Senate in 2008

Results

General election

Debates 
Complete video of debate, October 30, 2014 - YouTube

Predictions

Polling

General election

Results

See also 
 2014 United States Senate elections
 2014 United States elections
 2014 New Mexico gubernatorial election

References

External links 
 U.S. Senate elections in New Mexico, 2014 at Ballotpedia
 Campaign contributions at OpenSecrets
 David Clements for U.S. Senate
 Tom Udall for U.S. Senate
 Allen Weh for U.S. Senate

New Mexico
2014
United States Senate